Israel Premier Tech Roland is a professional women's cycling team based in Switzerland which competes in elite road bicycle racing events such as the UCI Women's World Tour.

Team roster

Major results
2018
 Overall The Princess Maha Chackri Sirindhorn's Cup "Women's Tour of Thailand", Olga Zabelinskaya
Stage 3 (ITT) Gracia–Orlová, Olga Zabelinskaya
Grand Prix Fémin'Ain d'Izernore, Elyzaveta Oshurkova
VR Women ITT, Antri Christoforou
Ljubljana–Domžale–Ljubljana TT, Olga Zabelinskaya
 Youth classification Tour de Feminin-O cenu Českého Švýcarska, Mariia Novolodskaia
Chrono des Nations, Olga Zabelinskaya
2019
Scorpions' Pass Time Trial, Antri Christoforou
Aphrodite Cycling Race Individual Time Trial, Olga Zabelinskaya
Aphrodite Sanctuary Cycling Race, Olga Zabelinskaya
2020
GP Alanya, Diana Klimova
GP Velo Alanya, Diana Klimova
Grand Prix Mount Erciyes 2200 mt, Maria Novolodskaya
Grand Prix World's Best High Altitude, Maria Novolodskaya
2021
Germenica GP, Olga Zabelinskaya
Grand Prix Erciyes, Tamara Dronova
Grand Prix Kayseri, Olga Zabelinskaya
UCI Track World Cup – Saint Petersburg (Madison), Gulnaz Khatuntseva
UCI Track World Cup – Saint Petersburg (Madison), Diana Klimova

Continental & National Champions

2018
 Cyprus Time Trial, Antri Christoforou
 Cyprus Road Race, Antri Christoforou
 Russia Time Trial, Olga Zabelinskaya
 Russia Track (Omnium), Gulnaz Badykova
 Russia Track (Team Pursuit), Evgenia Romanyuta
 Russia Track (Team Pursuit), Gulnaz Badykova
 Russia Track (Madison), Gulnaz Badykova
 European U23 Track (Madison), Maria Novolodskaya
2019
 Asian Track (Points Race), Olga Zabelinskaya
 Cyprus Time Trial, Antri Christoforou
 Cyprus Road Race, Antri Christoforou
 Uzbekistan Road Race, Olga Zabelinskaya
 Uzbekistan Time Trial, Olga Zabelinskaya
2020
 Russia Time Trial, Elizaveta Oshurkova
 Croatia Time Trial, Mia Radotić
 Russia Road Race, Diana Klimova
 European U23 Track (Omnium), Maria Novolodskaya
2021
 Russia Time Trial, Tamara Dronova
 Croatia Time Trial, Mia Radotić
 Russia Track (Omnium), Gulnaz Khatuntseva

References

External links

UCI Women's Teams
Cycling teams based in Russia
Cycling teams established in 2018
2018 establishments in Russia